Leo Adler (1895–1993) was a newspaper and magazine seller from Baker City, Oregon, and founder of the Leo Adler Trust.

The Adler House Museum, the former home of Leo Adler is now the Baker Heritage Museum's largest artifact. Leo Adler was a Baker City philanthropist who donated millions to the people of Baker County in his will. The Adler house has been restored to his original splendor with original furnishings and interiors.

References

External links
Leo Adler Foundation
Adler House Museum

1895 births
1993 deaths
Businesspeople from Oregon
People from Baker City, Oregon
20th-century American businesspeople